Otto John (19 March 1909 – 26 March 1997) was a German lawyer and intelligence official. During World War Two, he was a conspirator in the 20 July plot to assassinate Adolf Hitler.  Following the war, he became the first head of West Germany's domestic intelligence service, the Federal Office for the Protection of the Constitution. In July 1954, he surfaced in East Germany, where he made public appearances criticizing the government in Bonn and Chancellor Konrad Adenauer.  After his return to West Germany in 1955, despite maintaining that he had been drugged and kidnapped, John was convicted and sentenced to prison for treason.

Life
Otto John was born in Marburg. He earned a doctorate of law from the University of Marburg. He married Lucie Manén in 1949.

John was involved in the plot of 20 July 1944 to assassinate Adolf Hitler, for which his brother, Hans, was executed. At the time, he worked as a lawyer at the Deutsche Lufthansa legal office in Madrid and used contacts he had made with British intelligence to escape to England and avoid certain execution. He worked for the BBC German Language Service and in black propaganda at The Rookery, in the village of Apsley Guise, in England, and towards the end of the conflict for Soldatensender Calais.

After the war, he helped British authorities to categorise the degree of Nazi ideology of German wartime leaders and appeared as a witness at the Nuremberg War Crimes Trials. During the Trial of Erich von Manstein he worked as an interpreter.

On 4 December 1950, he was appointed president of the West German Federal Office for the Protection of the Constitution (Bundesamt für Verfassungsschutz). His appointment went against the will of Chancellor Konrad Adenauer but was supported by British officials.

On 20 July 1954, after a ceremony remembering the conspirators of 1944, he left his hotel and disappeared.  He reappeared three days later in East Berlin, stating that he had decided to move to East Germany and criticizing Adenauer's policies of remilitarisation and integration into the Western Bloc, which in his view hampered German reunification. He also criticized the appointment of former Nazis to high offices, such as Theodor Oberländer and Reinhard Gehlen.  

From August to December, he was interrogated by the KGB in Moscow before he returned to East Berlin, where he resumed his criticism of West Germany as a speaker. During that time, he was surveilled by East Germany's security service, the Staatssicherheit.

On 12 December 1955, John defected to West Germany where he was instantly arrested. He now claimed that his move to East Berlin was not voluntary but that he was abducted by the KGB. As his explanations were not believed, he was charged with treason and sentenced to four years' imprisonment but was released on 28 July 1958.  John expressed bitterness about the fact that in the court that found him guilty, there were judges who had been on the bench during the Hitler era. According to Markus Wolf, head of the DDR's foreign intelligence service, John had been drugged and abducted through an acquaintance, Dr. Wohlgemuth. John did not want to defect but considered after his kidnapping that he was irreparably compromised.

John died in 1997, at an Innsbruck sanatorium, after years of trying to get rehabilitation for his treason conviction.

Books 
Twice Through the Lines - Futura Publications (1974).

References

External links 

"The Man with 1,000 Secrets" Time Magazine, August 2, 1954.

1909 births
1997 deaths
People from Marburg
Jurists from Hesse
German resistance members
West German defectors to East Germany
Members of the 20 July plot
People convicted of spying for East Germany